Anwara Begum (born 1948) is a Bangladeshi film actress.

Anwara Begum may also refer to:

 Anwara Begum (academic) (died 2018), academic, first women vice-chancellor and first lady of Bangladesh
 Anwara Begum (politician) (died 2019), Bangladeshi politician